Josep Maria Margall i Tauler (born 17 March 1955 in Calella, Catalonia, 
Spain) is a retired Spanish professional basketball player. Standing at 1.98 m (6'6"), he played at the small forward position.

Professional career
Margall's number 7 jersey was retired by Joventut Badalona.

Spain national team
Margall earned 187 times with the senior Spain national basketball team.

References
 ACB Profile 

1955 births
Living people
BC Andorra players
Spanish expatriate basketball people in Andorra
Basketball players at the 1980 Summer Olympics
Basketball players at the 1984 Summer Olympics
Basketball players at the 1988 Summer Olympics
CB Girona players
Basketball players from Catalonia
Joventut Badalona players
Liga ACB players
Olympic basketball players of Spain
Olympic medalists in basketball
Olympic silver medalists for Spain
People from Calella
Sportspeople from the Province of Barcelona
Small forwards
Spanish men's basketball players
1982 FIBA World Championship players
1986 FIBA World Championship players
Medalists at the 1984 Summer Olympics